Cardinal Borromeo may refer to:

 Charles Borromeo (1538–1584), Italian saint, cardinal archbishop of Milan from 1564 to 1584
 Federico Borromeo (1564–1631), Italian cardinal from 1587, archbishop of Milan from 1595, patron of art
 Edoardo Borromeo (1822–1881), Italian cardinal from 1868, Camerlengo of the Holy Roman Church

See also
 House of Borromeo, to which all belonged